Simone Bracalello (born October 21, 1985), also known in Italy as Bracca, is an Italian former footballer who played as a forward.

Career

Italy
Born in Genoa, Bracalello was a member of the youth academy at famed Italian club Sampdoria before making his professional debut in 2002 aged 17 playing with Savona in Serie C2. He went on to play extensively in the Italian lower leagues, including stints with teams such as Vado and Prato in Serie D and Lega Pro Seconda Divisione, before leaving Prato at the end of 2008.

United States
Bracalello trained with Serie C1 side Pescara, and with Australian side Newcastle Jets in 2008, and attended a combine with the Minnesota Thunder in 2009, before being signed by the NSC Minnesota Stars of the USSF Division 2 Professional League in the United States in early 2010.  During his first season with the Stars, Bracalello was used primarily as a substitute, often having an immediate impact on the match.

On June 9, 2010 during a home game against the Montreal Impact, he assisted on Melvin Tarley's game-winning goal in the 87th minute.  Six days later, Bracalello scored his first goal for the Stars in a 4–2 win over the KC Athletics in the U.S. Open Cup.

On January 6, 2015 the Carolina Railhawks announced that they had signed Bracalello.

References

1985 births
Living people
Italian footballers
Association football forwards
U.C. Sampdoria players
Como 1907 players
A.C. Prato players
Minnesota United FC (2010–2016) players
North Carolina FC players
USSF Division 2 Professional League players
North American Soccer League players
Italian expatriate footballers
Footballers from Genoa
Expatriate soccer players in the United States
F.S. Sestrese Calcio 1919 players
F.C. Vado players